Olena Yuriyivna Iurkovska (born 27 September 1983) is a cross-country skier and biathlete from Ukraine, and a five time Paralympic Champion. She has competed at every Winter Paralympic Games since 2002, winning a total of five gold, five silver, and five bronze medals up to 2010. She also competed at the 2004 Summer Paralympics, as a member of the Ukrainian volleyball team.

Iurkovska was awarded the title Hero of Ukraine in April 2006. She won the Whang Youn Dai Achievement Award in 2006.

References 

Living people
People from Kolomyia
Ukrainian female biathletes
Ukrainian female cross-country skiers
Sportspeople with limb difference
Paralympic cross-country skiers of Ukraine
Paralympic biathletes of Ukraine
Cross-country skiers at the 2002 Winter Paralympics
Cross-country skiers at the 2006 Winter Paralympics
Cross-country skiers at the 2010 Winter Paralympics
Biathletes at the 2002 Winter Paralympics
Biathletes at the 2006 Winter Paralympics
Biathletes at the 2010 Winter Paralympics
Paralympic gold medalists for Ukraine
Paralympic silver medalists for Ukraine
Paralympic bronze medalists for Ukraine
1983 births
Recipients of the title of Hero of Ukraine
Biathletes at the 2014 Winter Paralympics
Medalists at the 2002 Winter Paralympics
Medalists at the 2006 Winter Paralympics
Medalists at the 2010 Winter Paralympics
Medalists at the 2014 Winter Paralympics
Ukrainian sitting volleyball players
Women's sitting volleyball players
Paralympic medalists in cross-country skiing
Paralympic medalists in biathlon
Sportspeople from Ivano-Frankivsk Oblast